Future Shock is an EP by New Zealand band The Gordons, released in 1980. In contrast to much of the independent New Zealand rock of the time, the sound of the EP was more noisy and distorted.

The EP was reissued by Flying Nun Records.

Critical reception
Trouser Press wrote that it "matched progressive punk songwriting and aggression with an uncategorizably deliberate yet extreme wall of flailing sheetmetal guitar."

Track listing
Side A
Future Shock    
Side B
Machine Song    
Adults And Children

Personnel
Brent McLaughlin (drums)
Alister Parker (guitar, vocals)
John Halvorsen (guitar, vocals)

References

Dunedin Sound albums
1980 EPs